Ephraim Oshry (1914–2003), was an Orthodox rabbi, posek, and author of The Annihilation of Lithuanian Jewry. He was one of the few European rabbis to survive the Holocaust.

Early life 
Ephraim Oshry was born in Kupiškis, Lithuania. He studied alongside some of the most prominent and revered Jewish leaders and rabbis of his time, including the Alter of Slabodka, Moshe Mordechai Epstein, Isaac Sher and Avraham Duber Kahana Shapiro (author of Devar Avraham). He quickly rose to prominence among the students at Slabodka Yeshiva.

World War II
When the Nazis invaded Kaunas in 1941 during World War II, Oshry's community was forced into the Kaunas Ghetto and Concentration Camp, where his first wife and children were murdered.

In his book, The Annihilation of Lithuanian Jewry, Oshry tells his story of living through the Holocaust. He related in horrific detail how the Nazis and their Lithuanian collaborators viciously murdered Jews, but he also focused on the spiritual life of the Jews living in the Kovno Ghetto and concentration camp. Despite being starved and beaten, the Jews continued to study Torah in secret, and risked their lives in order to fulfill the mitzvot (God's commandments).

Responsa
While in the Kovno Ghetto and concentration camp, Oshry began writing his responsa regarding the Holocaust, answering difficult questions in such subjects as human nature, God, and Jewish ethics. Before the final battle between the Nazis and the Soviets, Oshry buried his responsa in the ground. After the war, he retrieved them, and in 1959, he published some of the Hebrew responsa under the title She'eilos Uteshuvos Mima'amakim (Questions and Responses from the Depths). This volume was later followed by four additional volumes, the final one being published in 1979. An English volume of the original work (adbridged, with much of the halakhic argumentation removed), was published, titled Responsa from the Holocaust.

Post-war activities
After Kaunas was liberated in August 1944, Oshry and his wife Frieda Greenzwieg, a survivor of Auschwitz, went to Rome. There Oshry started a yeshiva for orphaned refugee children.

In 1950, Oshry moved to Montreal, Quebec, Canada, with his family and yeshiva students.

In 1952, Oshry moved to New York City, where he became the rabbi of Beth Hamedrash Hagodol. Oshry opened a yeshiva for boys and a yeshiva for girls named Yeshivah Torah V'Emunah in the East Bronx.

Family 
In 1949, Oshry became engaged to his second wife, Frieda Greensweig, a daughter of Sigeter Hasidim, at the suggestion of her uncle Moshe Friserman, the Tomashover Rebbe. Together they had 6 sons, all of whom became rabbis, and 3 daughters. Frieda died in 2018.

Death 
Oshry died on September 28, 2003, at Mount Sinai Hospital in New York City. Nearly 1,000 mourners attended his funeral. He is buried in Jerusalem.

Legacy 
Yeshiva Shaar Ephraim in Monsey, New York is named after him. It is headed by his  son-in-law.

Works 
 Oshry, Ephraim. Annihilation of Lithuanian Jewry, Judaica Press, 1995 
 Oshry, Ephraim. Responsa from the Holocaust, B. Goldman and Y. Leiman Eds., Judaica Press, 2001

See also 

 Yisroel Spira

References

External links
 Individual PDFs of each of the five Hebrew volumes can be accessed at the following links: Volumes "one", "two", "three", "four" and "five".

1914 births
2003 deaths
People from Kupiškis
20th-century Lithuanian rabbis
American people of Lithuanian-Jewish descent
Lithuanian emigrants to Italy
Kovno Ghetto inmates
Jewish American historians
Personal accounts of the Holocaust
Writers from New York City
Orthodox rabbis from New York City
Historians from New York (state)
20th-century American rabbis
21st-century American rabbis